Dieter Bokeloh (28 January 1942 – 24 March 2022) was a German ski jumper who competed in the early 1960s. He finished fourth in the individual large hill event at the 1964 Winter Olympics in Innsbruck. Bokeloh was born in Benneckenstein and died on 24 March 2022 at the age of 80.

References

External links

1942 births
2022 deaths
German male ski jumpers
Ski jumpers at the 1964 Winter Olympics
Olympic competitors for East Germany
Olympic ski jumpers of the United Team of Germany
People from Oberharz am Brocken
Sportspeople from Saxony-Anhalt